John Shafto may refer to:
 John Shafto (footballer)
 John Shafto (MP)